Veleba (feminine Velebová) is a Czech surname derived from the verb velebit (to praise). Notable people with the surname include:

 Jan Veleba (born 1986), Czech athlete
 Jan Veleba (politician), Czech politician
 Pavel Veleba, Czech footballer

Czech-language surnames